Masaka–Mbarara Water Supply and Sanitation Project (MMWSSP), is a water intake, purification, distribution and waste water collection and disposal system in the cities of Masaka and Mbarara in the Central Region and the Western Region of Uganda. The project is intended to meet the water supply and sanitation needs of approximately 1,055,000 by 2030. The work is to be carried out by the Uganda Ministry of Water and Environment through the parastatal utility company, National Water and Sewerage Corporation (NWSC). Funding (loan and grants), have been provided by the French Development Agency and the European Union.

Location

Overview
The Government of Uganda (GoU) is in the process of improving the water supply and sewerage systems in three urban centres in south-western Uganda; namely Masaka, Mbarara and Isingiro. The improvements will also benefit the peri-urban areas around the three cities and over 40 small urban centres in the three districts. The GoU is working through Uganda's Ministry of Water and Environment, in collaboration with National Water and Sewerage Corporation (NWSC), the government-owned water and sanitation company. Funding is sourced through loans and grants from Agence française de développement (AFD) and the European Union.

The water intake point will be from the Kagera River that forms the southern border of Isingiro District and simultaneously the international border between Uganda and neighboring Tanzania. The raw water will be pumped to a location where a new water purification plant will be constructed. The treated potable water will then be distributed to (a) Masaka City and environs (b) Mbarara City and environs and (c) Isingiro City and surrounding rural communities.

This project is affiliated with another ongoing government undertaking by the same ministry; the Isingiro Water Supply and Sanitation Project. The Kagera River will serve as the raw water source for the city of Isingiro as well. This project will also be executed by NWSC, also with funding from the AFD.

Other considerations
In Mbarara City, GoU is collaborating with RSK Uganda, a subsidiary of the RSK Group, an environmental engineering and services conglomerate, based in the United Kingdom. The detailed scope of work in Mbarara has the following components:

1.

2.

3.

4. Rehabilitation of waste stabilization ponds in the areas of Katete, Kakoba and Kizungu.

5.

Construction
In October 2022, the engineering, procurement and construction (EPC) contract was awarded to Sogea-Satom, a subsidiary of the French group Vinci SA. Work includes the construction of a new raw water intake on the Kagera River, the construction of a new water treatment plant with capacity of  every 24 hours. An estimated 200 new staff are expected to be hired for the work, which is expected to take about two years. The contact price is €73 million, borrowed from the French Development Agency (AFD).

See also
 Ministry of Water and Environment (Uganda)
 Busia Water Supply and Sanitation Project
 Gulu Water Supply and Sanitation Project

References

External links
 Website of National Water & Sewerage Corporation
 Website of Ministry of Water and Environment (Uganda)

Buildings and structures in Uganda
Masaka District
Mbarara District
Water resources management
Central Region, Uganda
Western Region, Uganda